Zheng Zelong (born 13 November 1997) is a Chinese footballer currently playing as a midfielder for Shanghai Port.

Career statistics

Club
.

References

1997 births
Living people
Chinese footballers
Association football midfielders
China League Two players
Shanghai Port F.C. players